Stellar is a Canadian romantic drama film, directed by Darlene Naponse and released in 2022. The film stars Braeden Clarke and Elle-Máijá Tailfeathers as an indigenous man and woman who meet and initiate a romantic relationship, setting off a cosmic chain of events that may save the world from destruction.

The film entered production in 2021 on the territory of the Atikameksheng Anishnawbek First Nation near Sudbury, Ontario. Its cast also includes Rossif Sutherland, K. C. Collins, Billy Merasty, Tina Keeper and R. H. Thomson.

The film premiered in the Contemporary World Cinema program at the 2022 Toronto International Film Festival on September 12, 2022. It was subsequently selected as the opening film of the 2022 imagineNATIVE Film and Media Arts Festival.

References

External links 
 

2022 films
2022 drama films
Canadian romantic drama films
English-language Canadian films
First Nations films
Films shot in Greater Sudbury
2020s Canadian films